Milwaukee Depot may refer to:

Train stations in the City of Milwaukee, Wisconsin
Milwaukee Intermodal Station
Everett Street Depot
Lake Front Depot

Train stations of the Chicago, Milwaukee, St. Paul and Pacific Railroad (CMStP&P), often referred to as the "Milwaukee Road"
Missoula station (Milwaukee Road)
Minneapolis station (Milwaukee Road)
Stations listed in Milwaukee Road Depot
Stations listed in :Category:Former Chicago, Milwaukee, St. Paul and Pacific Railroad stations